Hypopyra ossigera is a moth of the family Erebidae. It is found in China (Yunnan), Taiwan, India (Sikkim, Assam, West Bengal), Thailand, Vietnam, Malaysia, Borneo, Sulawesi and Sumatra.

The wingspan is 56–74 mm.

References

External links

Species info

Moths of Asia
Moths described in 1852
Hypopyra